Mitrephora caudata is a species of flowering plant in the family Annonaceae. It is endemic to the Philippines.

References

Flora of the Philippines
caudata
Vulnerable plants
Endemic flora of the Philippines
Taxonomy articles created by Polbot
Taxobox binomials not recognized by IUCN